Burmeistera formosa is a species of plant in the family Campanulaceae. It is endemic to Ecuador.

References

formosa
Endemic flora of Ecuador
Data deficient plants
Taxonomy articles created by Polbot
Plants described in 1926